The 2010 If Stockholm Open was a men's tennis tournament played on indoor hard courts. It was the 42nd edition of the event known this year as the If Stockholm Open, and was part of the ATP World Tour 250 Series of the 2010 ATP World Tour. It was held at the Kungliga tennishallen in Stockholm, Sweden, from October 18 through October 24, 2010.

ATP entrants

Seeds

 Seeds are based on the rankings of October 11, 2010.

Other entrants
The following players received wildcards into the singles main draw:
  James Blake
  Michael Ryderstedt
  Stanislas Wawrinka

The following players received entry from the qualifying draw:
  Matthias Bachinger
  Ivan Dodig
  Filip Prpic
  Thomas Schoorel

Finals

Singles

 Roger Federer defeated  Florian Mayer, 6–4, 6–3
 It was Federer's 3rd title of the year and 64th of his career.

Doubles

 Eric Butorac /  Jean-Julien Rojer defeated  Johan Brunström /  Jarkko Nieminen, 6–3, 6–4

References

External links
 Official website 

 
If Stockholm Open
Stockholm Open
If Stockholm Open
If Stockholm Open
2010s in Stockholm